Paranhos may refer to:

Places
 Paranhos (Amares), a parish (freguesia) in Amares municipality 
 Paranhos (Mato Grosso do Sul)
 Paranhos (Porto)

People
José Paranhos, Viscount of Rio Branco
His son, José Paranhos, Baron of Rio Branco